Unicorn was a four-member K-pop girl group produced by veteran R&B singer Kim Jo-han under Show Brothers Entertainment. According to Kim, “the name refers to the group's goal to heal people with music, just like a unicorn's horn is said to have the power of therapy.” The band debuted on September 3, 2015.

History

Pre-debut
In 2013, Rumi debuted as a member of the girl group Purplay under the name Seolha.

2015: Debut with Once Upon a Time
Unicorn was first revealed to the public in August 2015 through Naver TV Cast's web miniseries I Am a Girl Group, a five-episode sitcom that “revolves around various topics concerning K-pop idols, such as dating and dieting.” On September 3, the group released their debut EP titled Unicorn 'Once Upon a Time'''. A music video for the album's title track, "Huk", was released on the same day.

 2016: Winnie's departure, new agency and 'Blink Blink' 

Somewhere in 2016, Winnie left the group because of health issues. After Winnie's departure, Unicorn moved to another agency 'Cartoon Blue Company'.

On July 26, 2016, they released a teaser for their comeback single entitled "Blink Blink". A day later, they released its full music video and their second mini album, Unicorn Plus / The Brand New Label''.

2017: Disbandment 

On September 5, 2017, Rumi posted on her Instagram that the group had disbanded, saying "I'm Rumi from UNICORN. On this day of September we stopped being UNICORN. I think [I] will disappoint fans who [have supported] us. We are very sorry but the love and support we received from you made us very happy & gave us great strength. Thank you very much. In the future the five of us will continue doing our best and working hard in our individual activities, so it would be great if you continue supporting us. It hurts to give this information but it doesn't mean the end! We believe that there will be a day when we will meet again. WE LOVE YOU ALL!"

Former members
 Yujin (Hangul: 유진)
 Rumi (루미)
 Gayoung (가영)
 Sally (샐리)
 Winnie (위니)

Discography

Extended plays

Singles

Filmography

Television

Videography

References

External links
Official Fan Cafe

K-pop music groups
Musical groups established in 2015
South Korean girl groups
South Korean dance music groups
Musical groups from Seoul
2015 establishments in South Korea
Musical quintets